McArthur River Mine Airport  is an airport  south of the McArthur River Mine townsite, Northern Territory, Australia.

Airlines and destinations

See also
 List of airports in the Northern Territory

References

Airports in the Northern Territory